Blue Roses is the debut studio album by American country music group Runaway June. It was released June 28, 2019 via Wheelhouse. "Buy My Own Drinks" was released as its debut single in August 2018 and reached the top 20 of the Billboard Country Airplay charts, making it the first time a female group or trio had done so in 14 years.

Content
Blue Roses was preceded by the release of three singles, though only "Buy My Own Drinks" ultimately made the tracklisting for the album. Three other songs originally featured on their self-titled EP were also reprised on the album, including a cover of Dwight Yoakam's "Fast as You." Of the 10 tracks on the album, members of Runaway June have writing credits on six, and it was produced by Dann Huff.

The group promoted the album during the C2C: Country to Country festival in March 2019 and 2020 and as a supporting act for Carrie Underwood on her Cry Pretty Tour 360, which began on May 1, 2019, alongside Maddie & Tae.

Commercial performance
The album debuted at No. 36 on Billboard Top Country Albums, and No. 5 on Country Album Sales, with 3,000 copies sold, 5,000 in equivalent album units. It has sold 7,600 copies in the United States as of October 2019.

Track listing

Personnel
Adapted from AllMusic

Runaway June
Naomi Cooke - lead vocals
Hannah Mulholland - background vocals
Jennifer Wayne - background vocals

Additional Personnel
Dave Cohen - accordion, keyboards
Ross Copperman - acoustic guitar, electric guitar, keyboards, programming
Dan Dugmore - electric guitar, steel guitar
Paul Franklin - steel guitar
Dann Huff - electric guitar
David Huff - programming
Charlie Judge - keyboards
Tony Lucido - bass guitar
Danny Rader - acoustic guitar
Jerry Roe - drums, percussion
Aaron Sterling - drums
Ilya Toshinsky - banjo, acoustic guitar, electric guitar, hi-string guitar
Derek Wells - electric guitar
Glenn Worf - bass guitar
Nir Z. - drums, percussion

Charts

References

2019 debut albums
Runaway June albums
BBR Music Group albums
Albums produced by Dann Huff